Sazzad Hossain (born 18 Jan 1995) is a Bangladeshi professional footballer who can play as a forward or as a right winger  for Mohammedan SC in the Bangladesh Premier League and the Bangladesh national team.

Club career

Early years
Sazzad started his football career by signing a contract worth Tk 10,000 for Patiya Upazila  of Chittagong. During his time in Chittagong, Sazzad played for Patiya Brothers Union and regularly practiced at the Brothers Union field, where the late Mahibullah Chowdhury, president of Patiya Brothers Union saw Sazzad's talent and gave him a chance to play. He went on to play in the  Chittagong Premier Division and Second Division Leagues before playing for Kadamtala Sangsad in the Dhaka Second Division Football League in 2015.

In 2016,  Patiya Upazila Football Club played a friendly match with Chittagong Abahani and during the game Sazzad entered the box twice. Although he did not get a goal that day, Arman Aziz, the former national team midfielder, was impressed by Sazzad's game, and after the game he joined the newly formed Saif SC in the Bangladesh Championship League, the same year.

Saif  SC
On 29 October 2016, Sazzad scored the third goal  in a 3–1 victory over T & T Club, as Saif SC played their first official match  During his first season at the club, Saif SC earned promotion to the top-tier, and Sazzad signed a 4 year contract extension the following year. Although he did not feature for Saif SC during their inaugural season at the top flight, Sazzad made 10 appearances the next year scoring his first Bangladesh Premier League goal against Muktijoddha SKC, on 1 August 2019. On 8 February 2021, Sazzad a stunning scored a solo goal during a 3-2 win over Arambagh KS, earning him nationwide praise.

In May 2022, Sazzad got his first international call up after impressing during the first half of the 2021–22 Bangladesh Premier League, scoring 4 goals in 12 league matches.

International career
After veteran striker Nabib Newaj Jibon, was suspended from the national team due to disciplinary issues, coach Javier Cabrera called up Sazzad as a replacement striker for the 2023 AFC Asian Cup qualification – Third Round & a practice game against Indonesia.

On 1 June 2022, Sazzad made his international debut for the Bangladesh national football team  during a FIFA Friendly, against Indonesia.

Personal life
Before making it as a professional footballer,  Sazzad worked at a NGO in the morning with a salary of Tk 2000 per month and then trained in the afternoon with his local club, due to pressure from his parents. However, he left the job within two months after joining.

In 2017, Sazzad could not play a single match for Saif SC, his father Kabir Ahmed was suffering from cancer the same year. Everyone depended on Sazzad's earnings from his playing career. However, coach Kim Grant did not let him make a single appearance during the entire season. On 21 April 2017, his father Kabir Ahmed passed away, as Sazzad was not able to pay the expensive treatment fees. Regarding his father's death, Sazzad said "I thought, if the coach had given me a chance, maybe a big club would have taken me after seeing my game. Father's treatment money would have been collected. But I never gave up hope. I kept trying."

Career statistics

Club

Notes

International

International goals

Senior team
Scores and results list Bangladesh's goal tally first.

References

External links
 

Living people
1995 births
Saif SC players
Mohammedan SC (Dhaka) players
Bangladesh Football Premier League players
Bangladeshi footballers
Bangladesh international footballers
Association football forwards